Stefan Władysław Bryła (born 17 August 1886 in Kraków – died 3 December 1943 in Warsaw, Poland) was a Polish construction engineer and welding pioneer. He designed and built the first welded road bridge in the world.

Biography
Bryła was a professor at the Lwów University of Technology from 1927 and at the Warsaw University of Technology from 1934. Bryła was the author of basic methods of welding steel structures.

In 1927 he designed the Maurzyce Bridge, first welded road bridge in the world. The bridge was erected across the Słudwia River in Maurzyce near Łowicz, Poland in 1929. It was still in use in 1977 at which point plans were undertaken to replace it with a wider structure. Consequently, the bridge was reinstalled as a historical monument at a site slightly upstream. In 1995, the American Welding Society presented a Historic Welded Structure Award for the bridge to Poland. He also designed high rise buildings: Drapacz Chmur in Katowice and the Prudential in Warsaw in 1932.

During World War II, Bryła taught at the Secret Universities. His teaching there led to his arrest by the Germans on 16 November 1943, together with his family. After a brief incarceration in the Pawiak prison, he was subsequently executed during the Action AB by the Germans in Warsaw on 3 December 1943 at 13 Puławska Street. His commemorative grave is located at the Powązki Cemetery in Warsaw.

Gallery

See also
List of Poles
Timeline of Polish science and technology

References

1886 births
1943 deaths
People from the Kingdom of Galicia and Lodomeria
Polish Christian Democratic Party politicians
Members of the Sejm of the Second Polish Republic (1922–1927)
Members of the Sejm of the Second Polish Republic (1928–1930)
Members of the Sejm of the Second Polish Republic (1930–1935)
Polish civil engineers
Lviv Polytechnic alumni
Academic staff of the Warsaw University of Technology
Polish people executed by Nazi Germany
Executed people from Lesser Poland Voivodeship
Academic staff of Lviv Polytechnic
Engineers from Kraków
Polish civilians killed in World War II